Ida Göthilda Nilsson (7 February 1840 – 24 December 1920) was a Swedish artist (sculptor).

Daughter of the professor and zoologist in Lund, Sven Nilsson, she was active as her father's assistant. Nilsson was also a student of the Danish artist Jacob Jerichau. She participated in the exhibit of the Royal Swedish Academy of Art in 1875, and was also represented in the Royal Swedish Academy of Science.

References
 Svenskt konstnärslexikon (Swedish Art Dictionary), Allhems Förlag, Malmö (Swedish)

Further reading 

 

1840 births
1920 deaths
Swedish women artists
Swedish women sculptors
20th-century sculptors
19th-century sculptors
19th-century Swedish women artists
20th-century Swedish women artists
19th-century Swedish sculptors
Swedish women archaeologists